Indium perchlorate is the inorganic compound with the chemical formula . The compound is an indium salt of perchloric acid.

Synthesis
Dissolving indium hydroxide in perchloric acid:

In(OH)3 + 3HClO4 -> In(ClO4)3 + 3H2O

Physical properties
Indium(III) perchlorate forms colorless crystals. It is soluble in water and ethanol.

The compound forms a crystallohydrate •8, that melts in its own crystallization water at 80 °C.

The octahydrate is easily soluble in ethanol and acetic acid.

References

Perchlorates
Oxidizing agents
Indium compounds